The Renault PR100 was a French full-size step-entrance single-decker bus chassis built and marketed originally by Berliet from 1971, and sold as a Renault following the merging of Berliet into Renault Véhicules Industriels.

The PR100 was intended to be replaced by the 1987 Renault R312 but sales continued with a revised model called the PR100.2 and in 1993 with a further revised version called the PR112 with the last delivery in 1999. Over 13,500 buses of the PR100 range were produced in France. An articulated version was also produced from 1980, the Renault PR180.

PR100 and PR100.2

The original PR100 was developed and manufactured by Berliet using mainly plans of the German "VÖV-Standard-Linienbus" of the late 1960s with an altered front-end and back. It was 11.23m long and had a wheelbase of 5.6m. It had a different interior to the German VÖV, with three variations of seating/standing combinations available with 2 or 3 doors. The engine was mounted underfloor in the rear. At first it was available with a Perkins V8.510 diesel engine producing . By 1973 a Berliet diesel engine was available (PR100.PB). 1979 the PR100 featured the Renault badge.

The PR100 received a slightly altered front end in 1984, along with some technical improvements. This new model was called the PR100.2 and can be identified by the revised front bumper arrangement incorporating the lights with an asymmetrical windscreen, arched top and a separately mounted destination display in the new front end.

The PR100 was mainly used in France, with some exported to Algeria, Australia and Morocco. The design was used by Jelcz in Poland under license, and large numbers were delivered to many Polish cities. The PR100.2 chassis was also assembled in Spain, with Hispano Carrocera bodywork but retaining the Renault front for early models.

The gearbox was a four-speed ZF automatic unit.

The PR100.2's body was 11.4m long on a wheelbase of 5.6m and 2.5m wide.

One was bodied in 1988 by Northern Counties for use as a demonstrator in the United Kingdom,  only leading to four additional orders, and one was in 1989 by Ansair in Australia and exported to Singapore as a demonstrator operated by Singapore Bus Services, however, demonstration was unsuccessful and returned to the manufacturer.

When Renault became the majority shareholder of Mack Trucks, Renault demonstrated the bus in Australia in 1985. ACTION purchased 258 and Transperth 250 PR100.2s. The ACTION buses were badged as Macks and bodied by Ansair, the Transperth examples as Renaults and bodied in Perth by Howard Porter, JW Bolton and Volgren. All retained the PR100 front-end.

PR112
In 1993 the PR112 was launched as an updated and revised version of the PR100 with a new front end designed by Safra, losing the distinctive windscreen and front quarterlight design. The last PR112 was delivered in 1999.

The articulated buses PR180 and PR118

The PR180 was a tri-axle articulated version of the PR100 and was referred to in marketing literature as the Megabus. Standard configuration was for 62 seats and 144 standing. The front half retained the 5.6m wheelbase of the PR100, with the rear half being 5.15m and an overall length of 24.38m. Its engined produced .

ACTION purchased 34 and Transperth 65. The ACTION buses were badged as Macks and bodied by Ansair, the Transperth examples as Renaults and bodied by JW Bolton. All retained the PR100 front-end.

It was replaced in 1993 by the PR112 based PR118.

The trolleybus versions ER100 and PER180
A trolleybus version of the PR100 was produced, called the ER100, and an articulated version with two fronts called the PER180. Berliet and Renault built the ER100 and PER180 for several French cities including Grenoble, Lyon, Marseille, Nancy and Saint-Étienne.

References

Berliet
Renault buses
Bus chassis
Full-size buses
Step-entrance buses
Trolleybuses
Buses of France
Vehicles introduced in 1971